Vizhinjam Lighthouse is situated near Kovalam beach in Kerala. It started functioning on 30 June 1972. Vizhinjam was a busy seaport in the eighteenth and nineteenth centuries. Before the current light was installed, there were no lighthouses at this location. A day mark beacon (flag mast) must have been there in 18th century. After 19th century, this port was in a neglected state. A lighted beacon was constructed in 1925 at nearby Kolachal. Subsequently, a day mark beacon was provided at Vilinjam during 1960.

Technical details 
The tower is cylindrical with a height of 36 meters. The paint markings are red and white bands. The lighthouse is equipped with metal halide lamps and direct drive mechanism. The light source was modified on 30 April 2003.

See also 

 List of lighthouses in India

References

External links 
 Directorate General of Lighthouses and Lightships

Lighthouses in Kerala
Buildings and structures in Thiruvananthapuram district
Transport in Thiruvananthapuram district
Lighthouses completed in 1972
1972 establishments in Kerala